Eastern Economic Forum ( or ВЭФ) is an international forum held each year in Vladivostok, Russia, for the purpose of encouraging foreign investment in the Russian Far East.

 
It is held each year since 2015 in September, at the Far Eastern Federal University in Vladivostok, Russia. The Japanese prime-minister has attended this forum in 2017.

Far East Economic Forum is sponsored by the organizing committee appointed by Roscongress, an association of the Russian Government, which also sponsors other international forums, such as St. Petersburg International Economic Forum.

See also
 St. Petersburg International Economic Forum
 World Economic Forum
 Boao Forum for Asia

References

External links
 
 Roscongress Foundation

Culture in Vladivostok
International conferences
Economy of Russia
Russian Far East
International conferences in Russia